Yang Yali is a Chinese sprint canoer who has competed since the mid-2000s. She won two silver medals at the ICF Canoe Sprint World Championships, with one in the K-2 1000 m (2006), as well as one in the K-4 1000 m (2007) events.

References

Chinese female canoeists
Living people
Year of birth missing (living people)
ICF Canoe Sprint World Championships medalists in kayak